Trina Nishimura is an American voice actress who has worked primarily with Funimation. She is known for the voice of Mikasa Ackerman on Attack on Titan and Kurisu Makise on Steins;Gate.

Early life and career
At age 3, her family moved to Amarillo, Texas and began doing plays and performing at the community theater at age 9, and continued acting through high school. She graduated from Amarillo High School, and later got her Bachelor of Arts degree  at the University of North Texas at Denton. She originally intended to go to law school, but was asked by a friend of hers in Amarillo to try auditioning for Funimation.

Her first voice acting role was in Desert Punk as Namiko. She voices Nadie in the girls with guns series El Cazador de la Bruja, and Mari Illustrious Makinami in Evangelion: 2.0 You Can (Not) Advance. In the hit anime Attack on Titan, she voices the lead female character Mikasa Ackerman.

Personal life
Nishimura is in a relationship with Dallas-based chef Justin Holt, who opened a ramen restaurant called Salaryman in September 2019. The restaurant was closed down in November 2020 when Holt was diagnosed with leukemia.

Filmography

Anime

Film

Other voice-over roles

References

External links

 
 
 

Living people
Actresses from Sacramento, California
American actresses of Japanese descent
Amarillo High School alumni 
American voice actresses
 
Place of birth missing (living people)
People from Amarillo, Texas
University of North Texas alumni

Year of birth missing (living people)
21st-century American women